Zenker's worm snake (Letheobia zenkeri) is a species of snake in the family Typhlopidae. The species is native to Central Africa.

Etymology
The specific name, zenkeri, is in honor of German botanist Georg August Zenker.

Geographic range
L. zenkeri is endemic to Cameroon.

Description
It has 18 scales around the body, and is "colourless" (farblos, in German).

Reproduction
L. zenkeri is oviparous.

References

Further reading
Boulenger GA (1914). "Descriptions of new Species of Snakes in the Collection of the British Museum". Annals and Magazine of Natural History, Eighth Series 14: 482–485. (Typhlops vermis, new species, pp. 482–483).
Chirio, Laurent; Lebreton, Matthew (2007). Atlas des reptiles du Cameroun. Paris: Publications scientifiques du Muséum national d'histoire naturelle. 688 pp. . (Rhinotyphlos zenkeri, new combination). (in French).
Hedges, S. Blair; Marion, Angela B.; Lipp, Kelly M.; Marin, Julie; Vidal, Nicolas (2014). "A taxonomic framework for typhlopid snakes from the Caribbean and other regions (Reptilia, Squamata)". Caribbean Herpetology 49: 1–61. (Letheobia zenkeri, new combination, p. 30).
Sternfeld R (1908). "Neue und ungenügend bekannte afrikanische Schlangen". Sitzungsberichte der Gesellschaft Naturforschender Freunde zu Berlin 4: 92–95. (Typhlops zenkeri, new species, p. 92). (in German).

Endemic fauna of Cameroon
Letheobia
Taxa named by Richard Sternfeld
Reptiles described in 1908